Brendan Kealy (born 1 January 1986) is an Irish former Gaelic footballer who played as a goalkeeper at senior level for the Kerry county team.

Career
Born in Killarney, County Kerry, Kealy first arrived on the inter-county scene at the age of seventeen when he first linked up with the Kerry minor team, before later joining the under-21 side. He made his senior debut during the 2010 National Football League. Kealy immediately became a regular member of the starting fifteen and has won three Munster medals on the field of play. He has been an All-Ireland runner-up on one occasion.

Kealy was a member of the Munster inter-provincial team on a number of occasions; however, he never won a Railway Cup medal. At club level he plays with Kilcummin.

Throughout his career Kealy made 28 championship appearances for Kerry.

Peter Keane brought Kealy in as goalkeeping coach of the Kerry senior team late in his tenure, while Keane's successor as manager Jack O'Connor (who had used Kealy as goalkeeping coach of the under-20 team) retained Kealy, so Kealy was there when the team won the 2022 All-Ireland Senior Football Championship Final.

Honours
Kerry
All-Ireland Senior Football Championship (1): 2014
Munster Senior Football Championship (7): 2010, 2011, 2013, 2014, 2015, 2016, 2017
National Football League (1): 2017
Munster Minor Football Championship (2): 2003, 2004

Kilcummin
 Kerry Intermediate Football Championship (1) 2018 (c)
 Munster Intermediate Club Football Championship (1) 2018 (c)
 All-Ireland Intermediate Club Football Championship (1) 2019 (c)

References

1986 births
Living people
All Stars Awards winners (football)
Gaelic football goalkeepers
Kilcummin Gaelic footballers
Kerry inter-county Gaelic footballers
Munster inter-provincial Gaelic footballers